William Inganga is a former Kenyan professional footballer who played for Cerro Porteño in the Primera División Paraguaya and in the 1996 Copa Libertadores, making three appearances. He also played for the Kenya National Team during one qualifier for USA 94.

References

External links

Paraguayan Primera División players
Living people
1969 births
Association football forwards
Cerro Porteño players
Kenyan footballers
Kenya international footballers